In trigonometry, the sinus totus (Latin for "total sine") was historically the radius of the base circle used to construct a sine table; that is, the maximum possible value of the sine.

Letting the notation  stand for the historical sine, and  stand for the modern sine function,

where  is the sinus totus,

References 

 
 
 

Angle